James Wightman Davidson (1 October 1915 – 8 April 1973) was a New Zealand historian and constitutional adviser. Professor of Pacific History at the Australian National University from 1950 to 1973, Davidson was the "founding father of modern Pacific Islands historiography as well as constitutional adviser to a succession of Island territories in the throes of decolonisation".

Life
Davidson was born in Wellington, New Zealand on 1 October 1915. He was educated at Waitaki Boys' High School and Victoria University College before studying as a doctoral student at St John's College, Cambridge. He gained his PhD in 1942 with a thesis on European penetration of the South Pacific, 1779-1842. After wartime work for the Naval Intelligence Division, Davidson returned to a fellowship at St John's, becoming university lecturer in colonial studies in 1947.

While advising chiefs in Western Samoa in 1949, Davidson accepted the new chair of Pacific history at the Research School of Pacific Studies at ANU. He continued advising islanders, helping to draft constitutions for the Cook Islands (from 1963), Nauru (from 1967), Micronesia (from 1969) and Papua New Guinea (at the time of his death). He died in Port Moresby and his body was buried in Canberra.

Works
 The Northern Rhodesian Legislative Council, 1947
 Samoa mo Samoa; the emergence of the independent state of Western Samoa, 1967
 Pacific Islands portraits, 1970
 Peter Dillon of Vanikoro: Chevalier of the South Seas, 1974

References

Further reading
 Munro, Doug. "J.W. Davidson on the Home Front.” in Scholars at War: Australasian Social Scientists, 1939–1945, edited by Geoffrey Gray, idem, and Christine Winter, pp. 187–206. Canberra: ANU E Press, 2012.

1915 births
1973 deaths
20th-century New Zealand historians
Historians of the Pacific
Alumni of St John's College, Cambridge
Academic staff of the Australian National University
Writers from Wellington City
People educated at Waitaki Boys' High School
Victoria University of Wellington alumni